Radio 1's Big Weekend 2015 was held in Earlham Park, Norwich between 23–24 May 2015.

Ticket sales
Tickets were released on 31 March 2015 at 8:05am, with 25,000 tickets available for each day respectively which were released in pairs. Within 40 minutes, all tickets were sold out. 55% of tickets were reserved for areas covered in Norwich City Council, a further 20% reserved for areas with a Norwich (NR) postcode. Another 20% was reserved exclusively for residents in the surrounding East Anglian region, and the final 5% for other audiences in the UK.

Lineup
Taylor Swift was announced as the first performer on 23 January 2015 by Nick Grimshaw on his breakfast show, and 13 February 2015 saw Florence and the Machine being announced for the Saturday. On 20 April the full lineup was announced, with Muse and Foo Fighters headlining. On 14 May Catfish and the Bottlemen replaced Sam Smith on the Main Stage after Smith had to have surgery.

Setlist

Saturday

Main Stage

In New Music We Trust Stage

Sunday

Main Stage

References

BBC Radio in Concert
May 2015 events in the United Kingdom
2010s in Norfolk
2015 in British music